Obukhovsky (masculine), Obukhovskaya (feminine), or Obukhovskoye (neuter) is the name of several inhabited localities in Russia.

Modern localities
Obukhovsky, Astrakhan Oblast (or Obukhovskoye), a settlement in Karaulinsky Selsoviet of Kamyzyaksky District in Astrakhan Oblast; 
Obukhovskoye (rural locality), a selo in Obukhovsky Selsoviet of Kamyshlovsky District in Sverdlovsk Oblast
Obukhovskaya, a village in Verkhovsky Selsoviet of Tarnogsky District in Vologda Oblast

Alternative names
Obukhovsky, alternative name of Obukhovo, a work settlement in Noginsky District of Moscow Oblast; 
Obukhovskoye, alternative name of Obukhovo, a selo in Obukhovsky Selsoviet of Pritobolny District in Kurgan Oblast;